Nikolajs Maskaļenko (born 11 February 1993) is a Latvian swimmer. He competed in the men's 50 metre breaststroke event at the 2017 World Aquatics Championships.

References

External links
 

1993 births
Living people
Latvian male breaststroke swimmers
Place of birth missing (living people)